Korabi Stadium ( is a multi-use stadium in Peshkopi, Albania. The stadium has a capacity of 6,000 people and it is mostly used for football matches and it is the home ground of Korabi Peshkopi.

References

KF Korabi Peshkopi
Football venues in Albania
Multi-purpose stadiums
Buildings and structures in Dibër (municipality)